Togra Sawroop Singh is located at south of Jhunjhunu City in the state of Rajasthan, India, and around 21 kilometers from headquarters. It was developed by Sawroop Singh around 100 years ago when a nearby village caught fire.

Villages in Jhunjhunu district